Janjalabad (also Romanized as Janjālābād and Janjelābād) is a village in Sangar Rural District, in the Central District of Faruj County, North Khorasan Province, Iran. At the 2006 census, its population was 148, in 33 families.

References 

Populated places in Faruj County